West Point Township is one of twelve townships in White County, Indiana, United States. As of the 2010 census, its population was 381 and it contained 141 housing units.

West Point Township was organized in 1845, and was named for a large tract of forest in the western part.

Geography

Adjacent townships
 Princeton Township (north)
 Honey Creek Township (northeast)
 Big Creek Township (east)
 Prairie Township (southeast)
 Round Grove Township (south)
 Pine Township, Benton County (southwest)
 Gilboa Township, Benton County (west)

Cemeteries
The township contains West Point Cemetery. Near the back of this cemetery is a marker for Alexander Lawrie, a northern captain in the Civil War and an artist of the Hudson River School. The market claims that Lawrie made a gift to the Indiana Museum of a set of 100 paintings of Civil War generals.

School districts
 
 Tri-County School Corporation

Political districts
 Indiana's 4th congressional district
 State House District 15
 State Senate District 07

References
 United States Census Bureau 2007 TIGER/Line Shapefiles
 United States Board on Geographic Names (GNIS)
 IndianaMap

External links
 Indiana Township Association
 United Township Association of Indiana

Townships in White County, Indiana
Townships in Indiana